Danielle Clode is an Australian author of literary non-fiction, history and children's books.

Life 

Clode was born in Adelaide in 1968 and spent her early years in Port Lincoln, South Australia. She later lived on a boat with her parents travelling around Australia and completing her schooling by correspondence.

Career 

Clode studied politics and psychology at University of Adelaide before completed her PhD in Zoology as a Rhodes Scholar at Oxford University. She has taught creative and professional writing at universities across Australia and is an associate at Melbourne University and Flinders University.

Distinctions 

Clode has received the Rhodes Scholarship (South Australia, 1990), the Victorian Premier’s Literary Award for Non-fiction in 2007, a Whitley Award for Best Popular Zoology book in 2017 and was short-listed for a Children’s Book Council Award in 2010 and 2016 as well as numerous writing fellowships. Clode's 2018 biography of Australian naturalist Edith Coleman, The Wasp and the Orchid, was shortlisted for the 2019 National Biography Award. In Search of the Woman Who Sailed the World was shortlisted for the 2022 Adelaide Festival Awards for Literature Nonfiction Award.

Bibliography 
Some of her books are:

 In Search of the Woman Who Sailed the World (Pan Macmillan 2020)
The Wasp and the Orchid: The Remarkable Life of Edith Coleman (Picador 2018)
From Dinosaurs to Diprotodons: Australia's Amazing Fossils (Museums Victoria 2018)
Killers In Eden: The True Story Of Killer Whales And Their Remarkable Partnership With The Whalers Of Twofold Bay 
 A Future in Flames 
 Prehistoric Giants: The Megafauna of Australia 
Voyages To The South Seas: In Search Of Terres Australes 
Prehistoric Marine Life in Australia's Inland Sea 
 Continent of Curiosities: A Journey Through Australian Natural History 
 As If for a Thousand Years

References

External links
 Official Website

Australian writers
Australian zoologists
Living people
Year of birth missing (living people)